Wily Modesto Peña Gutierrez (born January 23, 1982) is a Dominican professional baseball outfielder who is currently a free agent. He previously played in Major League Baseball (MLB) for the Cincinnati Reds, Boston Red Sox, Washington Nationals, Arizona Diamondbacks and Seattle Mariners, and in NPB for the Fukuoka SoftBank Hawks and Orix Buffaloes. At 6 feet, 3 inches in height and nearly 300 pounds, the right-handed batting and throwing Peña is considered a pure power hitter best known for his long-distance home runs and high strikeout rate.

Professional career

Cincinnati Reds
Peña proved his label as a power hitter, hitting a home run in his second major league game, off Chicago Cubs pitcher Steve Smyth.

From  through , Peña was a fourth outfielder with the Reds, and saw substantial playing time in center field covering for the often injured Ken Griffey Jr., and backing up Austin Kearns in right field. Over his career in Cincinnati, Peña batted .248 with 51 home runs and 134 RBIs in 302 games.

Boston Red Sox

Over the course of the season, Peña again served as a fourth outfielder and one half of a platoon in right field. He batted a career-high .301 with a personal best on-base percentage of .349 in 299 plate appearances. Following an injury to Coco Crisp, Peña filled in at center field. On May 27, he was placed on the 15-day disabled list after surgery was required for an injured tendon in his left wrist. On July 18, Pena was activated from the disabled list. After platoon-mate Trot Nixon injured his biceps on July 30, Peña played more frequently in right field. The next day he fell a double short of hitting for the cycle in a 9–8 win over the Cleveland Indians. Pena hit .301 with 11 home runs in the 2006 season. 
Peña hit a grand slam off closer Chris Ray of the Baltimore Orioles to help the Red Sox to a 5–2 victory on April 26. Throughout the season, Peña was rumored to be on the trading block, including a deal at the trade deadline that failed to go through.

Washington Nationals

On August 17, Peña was traded to the Washington Nationals, with the Red Sox receiving 25-year-old first baseman Chris Carter and the Arizona Diamondbacks receiving Emiliano Fruto and cash considerations from Washington. Peña hit well for the Nationals, and finished 2007 with a cumulative 289 at-bats, 13 home runs and he batted .259 with a .319 on-base percentage and a .439 slugging percentage.

His $2.3 million signing bonus is now the third largest ever for an amateur free agent. In December 2007, he signed a one-year contract with the Nationals for $2 million with a mutual option for 2009 of $2 million.

On March 28, Peña was designated for assignment by the Nationals and placed on waivers. Peña went unclaimed and declined an assignment to the minor leagues so he was unconditionally released.

New York Mets
On April 20, Peña signed a minor league deal with the New York Mets and was assigned to Triple-A Buffalo. He was released on June 22, 2009.

Bridgeport Bluefish
On May 30, 2010, Pena began playing for the Bridgeport Bluefish, an independent team in the Atlantic League.  In 38 games for Bridgeport, Peña hit .310 with 8 home runs and 38 runs batted in. During the offseason Wily played for the Tigres del Licey of the Dominican Winter League.

San Diego Padres
On July 19, 2010, Peña was signed to a minor league deal by the Padres and assigned to Triple-A Portland.

Arizona Diamondbacks
Peña signed a minor league contract with an invitation to spring training with the Arizona Diamondbacks prior to the 2011 season. As of mid-June, he was hitting .356 with 21 homers and 62 RBIs for the team's Triple-A affiliate in Reno. He was called up on June 21 and hit a home run that night in his first major league game in 3 years.

In a game against the Detroit Tigers on June 24, Pena launched a go-ahead homer an estimated 454 feet deep into the left-field seats at Comerica Park to give the Diamondbacks a 7–6 lead and the eventual victory.

Four days later, in a game at Chase Field with the Cleveland Indians tied at 4 in the bottom of the ninth inning and Ryan Roberts on third base, Peña powered a walk-off homer into the seats in left field giving the D-Backs a 6–4 win.

On July 15, 2011, Peña was designated for assignment. He was released on July 24.

Seattle Mariners
Pena signed a minor league contract with the Seattle Mariners on July 27, 2011. He had his contract purchased on August 13. He elected free agency on October 30.

In 76 minor league games that year, Pena hit 25 home runs with 77 RBI, with a line of .358 / .440 / .712 and an OPS 1.152.

Fukuoka SoftBank Hawks

On November 29, 2011, Pena signed a 2-year contract with the Fukuoka SoftBank Hawks of the Nippon Professional Baseball (NPB).

In 2012, he hit .280 with 21 home runs and 76 RBI in 130 games.

In 2013, he hit .233 with 16 RBI and 1 home run in 55 games.

Orix Buffaloes
In 2014, he hit .255 with 32 homers and 90 RBIs in 140 games for the Orix Buffaloes of NPB.

Rakuten Golden Eagles
In 2015, Peña moved to the Tohoku Rakuten Golden Eagles of NPB where he hit .268 with 17 home runs.

Cleveland Indians
On February 6, 2017, Peña signed a one-year minor-league contract with the Cleveland Indians. The team released him at the end of spring training.

Chiba Lotte Marines
On June 6, 2017, Pena signed with the Chiba Lotte Marines of NPB.

Philanthropy
In 2007, Peña and his MoPeace Foundation teamed up with Joslin Diabetes Center's Latino Diabetes Initiative for the Beisbol y Salud Latino Diabetes and Health Festival to educate Latino men, women and children about type 2 diabetes. Peña currently volunteers his time to youth baseball in the Tampa, FL area.

References

External links

Career Home Run Map

1982 births
Living people
Arizona Diamondbacks players
Boston Red Sox players
Bridgeport Bluefish players
Buffalo Bisons (minor league) players
Chattanooga Lookouts players
Chiba Lotte Marines players
Cincinnati Reds players
Columbus Clippers players
Dayton Dragons players
Dominican Republic expatriate baseball players in Japan
Dominican Republic expatriate baseball players in the United States
Fukuoka SoftBank Hawks players
Greensboro Bats players
Gulf Coast Yankees players

Louisville Bats players
Lowell Spinners players
Major League Baseball outfielders
Major League Baseball players from the Dominican Republic
Nippon Professional Baseball designated hitters
Nippon Professional Baseball outfielders
Orix Buffaloes players
Pawtucket Red Sox players
People from Laguna Salada
Portland Beavers players
Reno Aces players
Seattle Mariners players
Staten Island Yankees players
Tacoma Rainiers players
Tohoku Rakuten Golden Eagles players
Washington Nationals players
World Baseball Classic players of the Dominican Republic
2006 World Baseball Classic players